Lost Boy or Lost Boys also refer to:

Literature 
Lost Boys (Peter Pan), characters from the 1904 play by J. M. Barrie and its subsequent adaptations
The Lost Boy (novella), a 1937 work by Thomas Wolfe
Lost Boys (novel), a 1992 book by Orson Scott Card
The Lost Boy (memoir), a 1997 book depicting the life of Dave Pelzer
Lost Boys: Why Our Sons Turn Violent and How We Can Save Them, a 2000 book by James Garbarino
Lost Boys: Reign of Frogs, a 2008 four-issue comic book mini-series, a sequel to the 1987 film
The Lost Boy (novel), a 2009 work by Camilla Läckberg translated into English in 2013
The Lost Boys (comic book), a 2016 comics series, a sequel to the 1987 film
Lost Boy (2017 novel), a 2017 fantasy novel by Christina Henry

Theatre 
Lost Boy (musical), 2014 musical by Phil Willmott

Film and television
The Lost Boys (TV series), a 1978 BBC docudrama about Peter Pan creator J. M. Barrie and the Davies boys
The Lost Boys, a 1987 comedy/horror film directed by Joel Schumacher and starring Kiefer Sutherland
The Lost Boys (franchise), a media franchise originating with the film
Lost Boys: The Tribe, a 2008 film sequel
Lost Boys: The Thirst, a 2010 film sequel
Lost Boys of Sudan (film), a 2003 documentary directed by Megan Mylan and Jon Shenk
"The Lost Boys" (Stargate Atlantis), a 2005 episode of Stargate Atlantis
"Lost Boys" (Ghost Whisperer), a 2005 episode of Ghost Whisperer
The Lost Boy (The Sarah Jane Adventures), a 2007 story from the Doctor Who spin-off series
"The Lost Boy" (Gossip Girl), a 2009 episode of the CW television series
"Lost Boys" (Grimm), a 2015 episode of American television series Grimm
"Lost Boys" (American Dad!), a 2019 episode of the American animated sitcom American Dad!

Music 
 Lost Boys (band), a 1989 band formed by Steven van Zandt
 Lost Boyz, a 1993 hip-hop group from New York

Albums
 Lost Boys (album), a 1984 studio album by The Flying Pickets
 The Lost Boys (soundtrack), from the 1987 comedy/horror film
 Lostboy! AKA Jim Kerr, a 2010 rock album by Jim Kerr
 Lost Boy (MyChildren MyBride album), a 2010 album by the American metalcore band
 The Lost Boy (album), a 2019 studio album by YBN Cordae

Songs
 "Lost Boys", a song by The 69 Eyes from the 2004 album Devils
 "Lost Boys", a song by Death Grips from the 2012 album The Money Store
 "Lost Boy", a song by Relient K from the 2013 album Collapsible Lung
 "Lost Boy" (Ruth B song), a 2015 single
 "Lost Boy", a song by Troye Sivan from the 2015 album Blue Neighbourhood
 "Lost Boy", a song by Jaden Smith from the 2017 album Syre
 "Lost Boy", a song by Whitechapel from the 2021 album Kin
 "Lost Boys", a song by amazarashi from the 2022 album Nanagousen Lost Boys

Other uses 
LBi, a Dutch marketing and technology agency
The Lost Boys (professional wrestling), a professional wrestling tag team in the American independent circuit during the mid-1990s
Guerrilla Games, formerly known as Lost Boys Games, a Dutch video game developer
Lost boys (Mormon fundamentalism), young men excommunicated or pressured to leave polygamous groups
Lost Boys of Sudan, a Sudanese refugee resettlement program begun in 2001
Lost Boys Studios, a visual arts school in Canada

See also
 Lost Girls (disambiguation)
 Lost Children (disambiguation)